Aparadhi is a 1977 Indian Malayalam film, directed by P. N. Sundaram and produced by Pavamani. The film stars Prem Nazir, Madhu, Sheela and Jayabharathi in the lead roles. The film has musical score by Salil Chowdhary. The film was Superhit.

Cast

Madhu as Jayachandran
Prem Nazir as Circle Inspector Rajan
K. P. Ummer as Johnson
Sheela as Susheela
Jayabharathi as Lissy
Ashalatha
Bahadoor as Ouseppachan
Prathapachandran as Jayachandran's Father
Baby Babitha as Annie (Lissy's Daughter)
Balan K. Nair as Malayi Kunjumon
Master Raghu as Raju (Lissy's Son)
Master Sujith as Babu
Nanditha Bose as Sumathi
P. K. Abraham as DSP
Paravoor Bharathan as Tea Shop Owner Raman Nair
Santha Devi
T. P. Madhavan as Police Officer Kumaran
Veeran as Shankara Pillai (Susheela's Father)
R. K. Nair as Constable
Thrissur Elsy 
Nagesh as Goldsmith Rankan
 Kedamangalam Ali
 Victory Janardhanan
 C A Balan
 J R Anand
 LalithaSree
 Prajatha
 Meena Ilene Meyn

Soundtrack
The music was composed by Salil Chowdhary and the lyrics were written by P. Bhaskaran.

References

External links
 

1977 films
1970s Malayalam-language films
Films scored by Salil Chowdhury